Portaferry Rovers is a Northern Irish, intermediate football club playing in Division 1B of the Northern Amateur Football League. The club is based in Portaferry, County Down, and was formed in 1974. The club plays in the Irish Cup.

Honours

Junior honours
County Antrim Junior Shield: 2
1999-2000, 2012–13

References

Association football clubs in Northern Ireland
Association football clubs established in 1974
Association football clubs in County Down
Northern Amateur Football League clubs
1974 establishments in Northern Ireland